Rheinheimera aestuari is a Gram-negative, non-spore-forming, strictly aerobic and motile bacterium from the genus of Rheinheimera which has been isolated from coastal sediments from the Jeju Island in Korea.

References 

Chromatiales
Bacteria described in 2015